Erusin is the Hebrew term for betrothal. In modern Hebrew, "erusin" means engagement, but this is not the historical meaning of the term, which is the first part of marriage (the second part being nissuin).

Since the Middle Ages it is customary for the marriage to occur immediately after the betrothal, and to perform the betrothal during the marriage ceremony itself. Previously this was not the case, and there were often several months between the two events.

In Hebrew and classical rabbinic literature, betrothal is frequently referred to as sanctification (Hebrew: Kiddushin, קידושין), on account of the bride becoming "sanctified" (dedicated) to the groom.

In the Hebrew Bible 

The idea of erusin making the couple accountable to the law against adultery, which is punishable by death, whilst at the same time, not making them "completely" married appears in Deuteronomy.

A non-traditional view is that the betrothal was effected simply by purchasing the girl from her father (or guardian) (i.e. paying a bride price to the bride and her father). The price paid for her (bride price) is known by the Hebrew term mohar.  It was customary in biblical times for the bride and her father to be given parts of the mohar. Gradually it lost its original meaning, and the custom arose of giving the mohar entirely to the bride, rather than to her father.

The traditional commentators do not necessarily explain mohar this way. Rashi understands mohar as a form of ketubah, an agreement to pay a certain amount upon divorce, and Nachmanides understands it as sovlanut, a sort of dowry or engagement present. Rashi understands Rachel and Leah's complaint to Jacob ("we are considered strangers to him for he has sold us") as saying that it was not normal for a father to sell his daughters, at least not without also giving them a dowry.

The girl's consent is not explicitly required by any statement in the Bible, neither is there explicit permission to ignore it; but in one Biblical story, Rebecca was asked whether she agreed to be married before the marriage took place.

In the Talmud

The legal act 

The Talmud states that there are three methods of performing erusin; by handing the woman a coin or object of nominal value, by handing her a document and through consummation (sexual intercourse), although the last is prohibited by the Talmud because it is considered to be indecent for witnesses to watch a couple having intercourse (erusin ceremonies are to be confirmed by two witnesses). In all cases the woman's consent is required; however, it can be implied by her silence.

The ceremony

The blessings 
The erusin is preceded by a blessing over wine and then the bircat erusin (betrothal blessing). If forgotten before the ceremony, it can be recited before the ketubah is read. Originally the blessings were recited by the groom but today it is more common for someone else to recite them such as the wedding's Rabbi.

The betrothal 
Today, the custom is to perform the betrothal by giving the bride an object whose value is well known, and fairly constant: a gold ring without a stone. This is in accordance with the first method mentioned above.

The actual betrothal now takes place. The groom takes the ring and says in Hebrew, Behold, you are consecrated to me with this ring according to the laws of Moses and Israel. The groom now places the ring on the bride’s index finger.

The ketubah 
In order to separate the erusin and nissuin - the two parts of the wedding - the ketubah is read.

Other issues 
For legal purposes, a betrothed couple is regarded as husband and wife. Similarly, the union can only be ended by the same divorce process as for married couples. However, betrothal does not oblige the couple to behave towards each other in the manner that a married couple is required to, nor does it permit the couple to have a sexual relationship with each other.

The rabbis prohibited marrying without an engagement (shiddukhin). Therefore, an old custom is to sign a Shetar haT'na'im as a formal form of engagement, forming an informal declaration of the couple's intentions, and is read close to the start of the betrothal ceremony.

See also 
 Chuppah
 Jewish views on marriage

References

External links 

Engagement
Jewish marital law
Weddings by religion
Jewish life cycle
Hebrew words and phrases in Jewish law